Freaks of Nature is a 2015 American comedy horror film directed by Robbie Pickering and written by Oren Uziel. It stars Nicholas Braun, Mackenzie Davis, Josh Fadem, Joan Cusack, Bob Odenkirk, Keegan-Michael Key, Ed Westwick, Patton Oswalt, Vanessa Hudgens and Denis Leary. The film was issued in a limited release by Columbia Pictures on October 30, 2015.

The film follows three high-school outcasts whose social alienation is compounded when they join rival species in a town inhabited by humans, vampires and zombies. Aliens set the species against each other, and the outcasts try to band everyone together to fight the invaders.

Plot 
The town of Dillford, Ohio, is home to three species who despise each other: humans, vampires, and zombies. Vampires are the top of the food chain, both literally and in social circles, and tend to be the cooler kids in town. The zombies are able to leave their ghetto with special collars that keep them compliant. The humans languish somewhere in the middle, intimidated by the vampires while seeing the zombies as second class citizens. All seem to have their own communities and rules by which they keep a tense truce.

School nerd Dag sets out to lose his virginity with Lorelei, the hottest girl in school to prove he isn't a loser. He has issues with Rick Wilson, the baseball coach and manager of the local meat factory.  Rick fired all of the human employees, including Dag's mother, and replaced them with zombies as cheap labor. Rick taunts him with this as Dag practices his pitching and he chokes and ends up hitting one of the star athletes, injuring him severely.

Dag's hippy parents try to cheer him with a speech about the men in his family being late bloomers. When the euphemisms about puberty and "huge changes" make Dag uncomfortable, he stops his well meaning parents and tries to forget about the conversation.

Meanwhile, social outcast Petra is seduced and transformed into a vampire after being bitten by Milan - the high school's playboy vampire - while they are making out. Later he rejects her when she wants to make the relationship permanent, leaving her alone and now a vampire with no idea how to cope.

Dag's former best friend Ned, the brother of the athlete Dag injured, is also a social outcast at high school. He is one of the smartest people in the town but is ostracized by his sport loving father and receives only contempt from his teachers. Following an argument with his family, Ned visits the zombie ghetto and he allows a female teenage zombie to bite his leg, transforming him into a zombie so he doesn't have to think or be smart anymore.

Just as Dag is finally about to score with Lorelei, out of nowhere aliens invade Dillford, causing residents to believe that the vampires, zombies and humans are attacking each other. This causes an all out war between the three groups that envelopes the town in a free for all of vampires vs. humans vs. zombies.

Dag and Lorelei hide in a house which is raided by a group of vampires and Lorelei is seemingly killed by Petra, who has always been jealous of her. In subsequent brawls between the factions, Dag, Ned, and Petra reluctantly join and hide in Stuart Miller's basement, Stuart being the local doomsday nut. While sheltering from the invasion, Petra and Ned are overcome by hunger and eat Stuart and his mother.

The aliens are able to determine their location, causing them to seek cover at the high school. Ned and Dag fight about their former friendship and Dag not wanting to be a loser anymore so they stopped being friends. Ned, who is still a genius despite his non-verbal zombie status, leaves angrily. Later Petra and Dag become trapped and make out, but he flinches and Petra accuses him of being afraid of her.  The aliens find them again, and Dag realizes that the aliens can only see inorganic materials, such as their synthetic clothing. The three then strip and run to Dag's house, where they change into organic cotton clothes kept by Dag's hippie mother.

Later, Dag, Petra, and Ned are captured by the aliens. They are placed with other captured residents in a warehouse, with force fields segregating the humans, vampires and zombies. Dag and Petra find that instead of dying, Lorelei has been changed into a hot vampire, which intimidates Petra. After figuring out the weakness in the force field keeping them apart, Dag, Ned, and Petra convince everyone to band together to fight the aliens and destroy the force field.

At Rick Wilson's meat factory, the chemical "Tetrafluoraxipan" is used to transform horse cartilage into a meat-like substance and is what the aliens are after. Dag convinces Rick to let the town into the factory, as the aliens arrive and submerge in the chemical, combining to grow into a single large alien. It begins to make a speech about how they just wanted to ask nicely for the chemical, but the town's irritated residents interrupt when it starts getting condescending towards them. The townsfolk attack and the alien fights back but is weakened when the others realize that the ammonia tanks used in the factory can hurt it.

Meanwhile, Milan corners Petra and attempts to kill her.  He is stopped by Dag, who turns into a werewolf after almost being killed. He realizes this was the "big change" his parents were trying to talk to him about earlier.  After a short brawl, Milan is accidentally killed when he is impaled on a metal pole.

As the outclassed alien is shrinking back to its mini size, it attempts to escape by spaceship while dropping a bomb to destroy the town.  Ned catches the bomb, proving he's just as good as his athlete brother despite being a zombie. He gives it to Dag who pitches it into the ship before it closes its doors and the spaceship explodes, destroying the aliens.

Everything returns to normal for the town, and Lorelei asks Dag out on a date. However, Dag chooses to be with Petra instead.  Ned appears to be happier and better adjusted as a zombie, and seems to have bonded with his star athlete brother who has also become a zombie.

Cast

 Nicholas Braun as human (later, werewolf) Dag Parker
 Jacob Eddington as young Dag
 Mackenzie Davis as vampire Petra Lane
 Josh Fadem as zombie Ned Mosely
 Max Wright as young Ned
 Joan Cusack as Peg Parker
 Bob Odenkirk as Shooter Parker
 Keegan-Michael Key as Mr Mayhew P. Keller
 Ed Westwick as Milan Pinache
 Patton Oswalt as Stuart Miller
 Vanessa Hudgens as Lorelei
 Denis Leary as Rick Wilson
 Ian Roberts as Chaz Mosely, Sr.
 Utkarsh Ambudkar as Parminder
 Cerina Vincent as Daisy
 Chris Zylka as Chaz Mosely, Jr.
 Rachael Harris as Mrs Mosely
 Mae Whitman as Jenna Zombie
 Werner Herzog as the voice of the Perfect Being
 Derek Mears as the wolf
 Aurora Perrineau as the vampiress
 Pat Healy as the zombie priest
 Lilith Fury as vampire in cage 
 Natalie Palamides as Kathy Murch
 John Ennis as Coach Pulcifer

Production
The film entered development as "The Kitchen Sink". In March 2011, Jonah Hill was reported to be in talks to make his directorial debut with The Kitchen Sink. In February 2012, Robbie Pickering was chosen as the director for the film, though Hill would stay attached to the film as one of the executive producers. The film was renamed from "Kitchen Sink" to "Freaks of Nature".

Casting
In January 2013, it was reported that Nicholas Braun was in talks to join the film as well as Chris Zylka. In July of that same year, it was announced Vanessa Hudgens was in talks to join the film, as well as Denis Leary. On August 15, 2013, it was announced Ed Westwick was in talks to join the film. On August 19, 2013, it was announced Patton Oswalt, Bob Odenkirk, and Ian Roberts, Keegan-Michael Key, and Mackenzie Davis had all joined the cast of the film.

Filming
Principal photography took place in Los Angeles, California, and in Vancouver, British Columbia. Shooting began on August 15, 2013, and lasted 37 days. Shooting locations in Los Angeles included Santa Clarita, Temple City and Van Nuys High School. Vancouver locations included Steveston, Metrotown Mall and A.R. Macneill Secondary School.

Release
The film was initially scheduled for release on January 9, 2015. In October 2014, Sony pushed it back to September 4, 2015. On October 16, 2015, Sony announced it would have a limited release on October 30, 2015.

Soundtrack
 "My Life Is Right" by Big Star
 "Fever Dreaming" by No Age
 "Days" by The Drums
 "Kill for Love" by Chromatic
 "It's Simply Love" by The Longo Brothers
 "On My Mind" by CharlieRED
 "Deceive"' by Trentemøller
 "Moments of Love" by Debbie Martin
 "The Heat" by Jungle
 "Jump on It" by SweatBeatz
 "Germ-Free Adolescents" by X-Ray Spex
 "Evil Soul" by The Young Werewolves
 "User" by KOVAS
 "Fall in Love Again" by Fuzzy Dora
 "We Didn't Start the Fire" by Billy Joel
 "Born on a Saturday Night" by Mean Jeans
 "It's Alright, It's OK" by Primal Scream

Critical reception
Tim Janson of The SciFi Movie Page gave the film 2 stars out of 5 citing, "The ideal way to watch the film would be with your hand on the fast-forward button, stopping when Key, Leary, Odenkirk, and Oswalt are on screen and skipping through when they are not."

References

External links
 
 
 
 

2015 comedy horror films
American comedy horror films
American independent films
American zombie comedy films
Alien invasions in films
Films produced by Matt Tolmach
Films shot in Los Angeles
Films shot in Vancouver
Vampire comedy films
American werewolf films
Columbia Pictures films
2015 independent films
Films with screenplays by Oren Uziel
American vampire films
2010s English-language films
2010s American films